Wila Willk'i (Aymara wila blood, blood-red, willk'i gap, "red gap", also spelled Wila Willqui, Wila Wilqui) is a  mountain in the Andes of Bolivia. It is located at the Peruvian border in the La Paz Department, José Manuel Pando Province, Catacora Municipality, southwest of T'ula Qullu.

References 

Mountains of La Paz Department (Bolivia)